James Alexander (3 September 1916 – 23 October 1943) was an English cricketer. He played two first-class matches for Bengal between 1936 and 1938. He was killed in action during World War II.

See also
 List of Bengal cricketers
 List of cricketers who were killed during military service

References

External links
 

1916 births
1943 deaths
Bengal cricketers
British Indian Army officers
Cricketers from Kent
English cricketers
Indian Army personnel killed in World War II
People from Tonbridge
British people in colonial India